, , ;) is the capital of the comarca of Alt Empordà, in the province of Girona, Catalonia, Spain.

The town is the birthplace of artist Salvador Dalí, and houses the Teatre-Museu Gala Salvador Dalí, a large museum designed by Dalí himself which attracts many visitors. It is also the birthplace of Narcís Monturiol, inventor of the first successful machine-powered submarine. Also born here was Mónica Naranjo, one of the best selling Spanish singers of the 1990s and 2000s.

History
The town's name derives from that of Ficaris, of Visigoth origin. In 1267, King James I of Aragon conceded it fuero rights, but four years later Count Ponç IV of Empúries set the town on fire.

In 1794 Figueras was surrendered to France, but it was regained in 1795. During the Peninsular War it was taken by the French in 1808, recaptured by the Spaniards in 1811, and retaken by the French in the same year.

During the Spanish Civil War, it remained loyal to the Republican government, and was repeatedly bombed by the Nazi and Fascist Italian aviation.

It was one of the most heavily bombed Catalan cities during the Civil War, in 1938, and, especially, at the beginning of 1939, when thousands of people passed through the town on their way into exile. The number of bombing victims cannot be known with certainty, but could be close to 400.

Spain's Republican government held its final meeting of the civil war (on 1 February 1939) in the dungeons of its Sant Ferran Castel.

Figueres recovered starting from the 1950s, consolidating its economy around the tourism industry.

Main sights
 Sant Ferran Castle, built in 1753 during the reign of Ferdinand VI of Spain, on the site of a Capuchin convent.
 Parish church of St. Peter, in Gothic. It has a single nave with side chapels.
 Teatre-Museu Gala Salvador Dalí (19th century, renovated in the 1960s). It incorporates a tower from the ancient walls.
 Technical Museum of the Empordà, a technology museum with hundreds of antique typewriters
 Museu de l'Empordà

Transport
It is also served by its own railway station just east of the old town center.

Figueres has been connected since December 2010 to the high-speed rail network with the start of services connecting Figueres to Perpignan via LGV, allowing direct TGV services to Paris in 5 h 27 min.  Connections to Madrid-Barcelona via AVE began on 8 January 2013 and the trip takes 53 min to Barcelona Sants (12 min to Girona).

Notable people
Narcís Monturiol (1819–1885), pioneering submarine engineer and inventor
Salvador Dalí (1904–1989), world-renowned artist
Montserrat Minobis i Puntonet (1942–2019), feminist journalist
Montserrat Vilà (born 1964), ecologist
Mónica Naranjo (born 1974), singer and television host
Dídac Lee (born 1974), entrepreneur, former board member of FC Barcelona
Maverick Viñales (born 1995), MotoGP racer
Sílvia Soler (born 1961), writer and journalist

Twin towns – sister cities

Figueres is twinned with:
 Alcalá la Real, Spain (1989)
 Marignane, France (1968)
 Kalisz, Poland (1986)
 St. Petersburg, United States (2011)

References 
References

Literature
 Panareda Clopés, Josep Maria; Rios Calvet, Jaume; Rabella Vives, Josep Maria (1989). Guia de Catalunya, Barcelona: Caixa de Catalunya.  (Spanish).  (Catalan).

External links 

 Figueres Council: Figueres Council (Catalan)
 Government data pages 

 
Municipalities in the Province of Girona
Populated places in the Province of Girona